The Diocese of Fengxiang is a Latin Church ecclesiastical jurisdiction or diocese if the Catholic Church located in Fengxiang (Shaanxi), China. It is a suffragan diocese in the ecclesiastical province of the metropolitan Archdiocese of Xi’an.

It is believed that this diocese, headed by Bishop Luke Li Jingfeng until his death late in 2017, is the only one in China where neither the laity nor the bishop belong to the government-sponsored Chinese Patriotic Catholic Association. Since 2017, the bishop has been Peter Li Huiyuan.

History
 November 15, 1932: Established as Apostolic Prefecture of Fengxiangfu 鳳翔府 from the Apostolic Vicariate of Xi’anfu 西安府
 June 9, 1942: Promoted as Apostolic Vicariate of Fengxiangfu 鳳翔府
 April 11, 1946: Promoted as Diocese of Fengxiang 鳳翔

Leadership
Prefects Apostolic of Fengxiangfu 鳳翔府 
 Fr. Philip Silvester Wang Tao-nan, O.F.M. (王道南) (later Bishop) (October 26, 1933 – June 9, 1942)
Vicars Apostolic of Fengxiangfu 鳳翔府 
 Bishop Philip Silvester Wang Tao-nan, O.F.M. (王道南) (June 9, 1942 – April 11, 1946)
Bishops of Fengxiang 鳳翔 
 Bishop Philip Silvester Wang Tao-nan, O.F.M. (王道南) (April 11, 1946 – October 4, 1949)
 Bishop Anthony Zhou Wei-dao, O.F.M. (周維道) (May 31, 1950 – 1979)
 Bishop Lucas Li Jing-feng (1983 – November 17, 2017)
 Bishop Peter Li Huiyuan (November 17, 2017 – present)

References

External links
 GCatholic.org
 Catholic Hierarchy

Roman Catholic dioceses in China
Christian organizations established in 1932
Roman Catholic dioceses and prelatures established in the 20th century
Christianity in Shaanxi
Organizations based in Shaanxi